"Give It to Me Baby" is a song written by American singer Rick James. Taken from his album Street Songs, the song charted on the Billboard Hot 100, spending two weeks at No. 40 and spent five weeks at No. 1 on the R&B chart.  Two other tracks from Street Songs, "Super Freak" and "Ghetto Life", topped the American dance chart for three weeks in the summer of 1981. The song proved to be even more successful with R&B and dance club audiences. Part of the background vocals were sung by former Temptations member Melvin Franklin.

Charts

See also
List of Billboard number-one dance club songs
List of number-one R&B singles of 1981 (U.S.)

References

External links
 Lyrics of this song
 

Rick James songs
1981 singles
Songs written by Rick James
1980 songs
Funk songs
Gordy Records singles
Song recordings produced by Rick James